The 2017–18 Promotion League season is the 6th edition (the 4th since its name change) of the 3rd division of Swiss Football and is the third level of the football hierarchy in Switzerland, behind the Super League and the Challenge League. The Championship has 16 teams and each team plays 30 games.

FC Le Mont LS, which he had not received the license III in the 1st instance, has decided not to appeal. The club also decides that the team will also not play in Promotion League. FC United Zurich, 15th in the 2016-2017 season, is maintained in Promotion League. The 2017-2018 season started on 2 August 2017 and will finish on 26 May 2018.

Teams 
The 2017–18 season saw two new clubs in the league, Yverdon Sport FC and FC Stade Lausanne-Ouchy which were all promoted from the 1. Liga Classic. No club was relegated from the Challenge League as FC Le Mont didn't get their league licence by the Swiss Football Association and subsequently relegated.

Table

Topscorer 
Top Scorer

References

External links 
  

Swiss Liga Promotion
3